Yim Bang-eun (born 25 April 1978) is a former South Korean badminton player from Samsung Electro-Mechanics team.

Yim competed for Korea in badminton at the 2004 Summer Olympics in men's doubles with partner Kim Yong-hyun. They had a bye in the first round and defeated Lars Paaske and Jonas Rasmussen of Denmark in the second.  In the quarterfinals, Yim and Kim lost to Eng Hian and Flandy Limpele of Indonesia 15-1, 15-10. He is also a close relative on Jonathan Yim.

Achievements

World Junior Championships 
Boys' doubles

IBF Grand Prix 
The World Badminton Grand Prix sanctioned by International Badminton Federation since 1983.

Men's doubles

IBF International 
Men's doubles

Mixed doubles

References

External links 
 
 

1978 births
Living people
Sportspeople from Incheon
South Korean male badminton players
Badminton players at the 2004 Summer Olympics
Olympic badminton players of South Korea
Badminton players at the 2002 Asian Games
Asian Games gold medalists for South Korea
Asian Games medalists in badminton
Medalists at the 2002 Asian Games